Phulwaria is a census town in Varanasi district in the Indian state of Uttar Pradesh.

Demographics
 India census, Phulwaria had a population of 11,732. Males constitute 54% of the population and females 46%. Phulwaria has an average literacy rate of 66%, higher than the national average of 59.5%: male literacy is 75%, and female literacy is 55%. In Phulwaria, 13% of the population is under 6 years of age.

Some Facts
Phulwaria is situated on the bank of river Varuna which is a tributary of river Ganga.

References

Census towns in Varanasi district
Cities and towns in Varanasi district